Roughedge is an unincorporated community in Union County, North Carolina, United States.  It is located southwest of Monroe, at the intersection of NC 200 (Lancaster Highway) and NC 522 (Rocky River Road).

References

Unincorporated communities in Union County, North Carolina
Unincorporated communities in North Carolina